Anders Henriksson i Vinstorp  (1870-?) was a Swedish politician. He was a member of the Centre Party.

References
This article was initially translated from the Swedish Wikipedia article.

Centre Party (Sweden) politicians
1870 births
Year of death missing